Nigél Thatch (born August 8, 1976) is an American actor. He plays Malcolm X in the Epix television series Godfather of Harlem and was nominated for a best supporting actor award at the 51st NAACP Image Awards for the role. He also portrayed Malcolm X in the 2014 film Selma.

Early life
Thatch was born in East St. Louis, Illinois in 1976.

Career
In the 1990s he was on the television series The Parent 'Hood. Thatch appeared as "Leon", an egotistical money hungry athlete, in a series of Budweiser commercials. He played baseball for the Schaumberg Flyers.

In 2017 he was part of the CW series Valor. He was also in American Dreams (2002).

Since 2019, he has played the role of Malcolm X in Godfather of Harlem, for which he was nominated as for best supporting actor at the 51st NAACP Image Awards.

Filmography
Playas Club (1998)
100 Kilos (2001)
Selma (2014)

Television
Godfather of Harlem (2019–2021)
Valor (2017–2018)
American Dreams (2002)
The Parent 'Hood (1990s)
Moesha "Isn't She Lovely?" (1999)
Girlfriends - "The Importance of Being Frank" (2000)
Half & Half - "The Big Type Cast Episode" (2004)
One on One - "Fatal Attractions" (2002)

References

External links

"Vincent D'Onofrio and Nigél Thatch Interview: Godfather of Harlem" from Screen Rant
"Vincent D’Onofrio, Giancarlo Esposito, and Nigél Thatch on ‘Godfather of Harlem’ and Working with Forest Whitaker" from Collider

1976 births
Living people
21st-century African-American people
African-American actors
People from East St. Louis, Illinois
Male actors from Illinois
American male film actors
American male television actors
21st-century American male actors
20th-century African-American people